Andrew Gillett is an Australian historian who is associate professor of history at the Department of Ancient History at Macquarie University. A protégé of Walter Goffart of the Toronto School of History, Gillett researches and teaches the field of Late Antiquity.

Biography
Andrew Gillett is from Australia. He received his BA in Australian Social History and Modern European History from the University of Queensland (1986), and an MA (1989) and PhD (1994) in Medieval Studies at the Centre for Medieval Studies of the University of Toronto. His PhD was supervised by Walter Goffart, leader of the so-called Toronto School of History. At Toronto, Gillett was a co-student and intimate friend of Michael Kulikowski.

After gaining his PhD, Gillett taught at the universities of Toronto and Melbourne. Gillett is currently associate professor of history at the Department of Ancient History at Macquarie University.

Gillett researches and teaches the field of Late Antiquity in Western Europe. He is particularly interested in the role of communication in public life, and how the period of Late Antiquity has been constructed by modern historians. Gillett is well known as the editor of the book On Barbarian Identity: Critical Approaches to Ethnicity in the Early Middle Ages (2002).

Selected works
 Envoys and Political Communication in the Late Antique West, 411-533, 2003

References

Sources

External links
 Andrew Gillett at Academia.edu

Australian historians
Historians of antiquity
Living people
Year of birth missing (living people)
Academic staff of Macquarie University
University of Queensland alumni
University of Toronto alumni